The Altadena Apartments in Salt Lake City, Utah, which includes the Altadena Flats and the Sampson Altadena Condominiums, were built in 1905 or 1906 by the Octavius Sampson family at cost of $21,000.  The building has Tuscan columns, pediments, and dentillated cornices.

The buildings were deemed significant for association with the urbanization of Salt Lake City in the early 20th century.  The property consists of the three-story brick Classical Revival-style Altadena Apartments and an associated building, the Sampson Apartments.  These were "early examples from this period of apartment construction, during which time the typical apartment block was a three-story walk-up with two units on each floor flanking a central staircase. The Altadena and Sampson apartment blocks standout as high-end architectural representatives of the property type."

The property was listed on the National Register of Historic Places in 2010.

References

External links

1906 establishments in Utah
Apartment buildings in Utah
Buildings and structures in Salt Lake City
National Register of Historic Places in Salt Lake City
Neoclassical architecture in Utah
Residential buildings completed in 1906
Residential buildings on the National Register of Historic Places in Utah